Abdeslam Laghrissi (born 5 January 1962), also known as Abdeslam El-Ghrissi, is a Moroccan former footballer.

Club career
Laghrissi started his professional career in Moroccan side FAR Rabat. Early in the nineties he played in Qatar. Then he returned to Morocco where he played for Raja Casablanca and, for the second time, for FAR Rabat. He spent two years in Oman where he played for Al-Suwaiq before retiring in 2000.

International career
He played for the Morocco national football team from 1983 to 1995. In 1984, he took part in 1984 Summer Olympics. In 1992, he was capped for the African Cup of Nations, and was a participant at the 1994 FIFA World Cup, when he played a match as a used substitute against Saudi Arabia.

Personal honours
When playing for FAR Rabat, Laghrissi was the topscorer of the Moroccan premier division three times, in 1983, 1990 and 1995.

References

External links
Abdelslam LAGHRISSI at FIFA.com

1962 births
Expatriate footballers in Oman
Expatriate footballers in Qatar
Moroccan footballers
Morocco international footballers
Olympic footballers of Morocco
Footballers at the 1984 Summer Olympics
1994 FIFA World Cup players
1992 African Cup of Nations players
AS FAR (football) players
Raja CA players
People from Ksar el-Kebir
Moroccan expatriate footballers
Moroccan expatriate sportspeople in Oman
Moroccan expatriate sportspeople in Qatar
Botola players
Association football forwards
Living people